INS Makar (J31) is the lead ship of  of survey catamarans used for hydrographic survey by the Indian Navy. It  was built indigenously in India by Alcock Ashdown Limited, Gujarat.

Description 
INS Makar is tasked with undertaking hydrographic surveys for producing navigational charts and is capable of collecting marine environmental information by conducting limited oceanographic surveys.

Equipped with four engines and two bow thrusters, Makar has an Integrated Platform Management System that combines the vessel's power, navigation and propulsion systems. She also carries onboard survey motorboats, autonomous underwater vehicles and remotely operated vehicles for carrying out surveys. Makar is further fitted with a wide range of survey equipment that includes sounding systems, bottom profilers and an advanced electronic positioning system. Air conditioned data processing facilities are available on board Makars caravan.

Service history 
Laid down in 2008, she was launched two years later at Bhavnagar and was commissioned into the Navy at the Seabird Naval Base, Karwar in September 2012 by the then Flag Officer Commanding-in-Chief of the Western Naval Command, Vice Admiral Shekhar Sinha. She is named after the constellation of Capricorn.

See also 
 List of multihulls

References 

Individual catamarans
Ships of the Indian Navy
Ships built in India
2010 ships